Kakoli (also Romanized as Kākolī and Kakolī; also known as Kakol) is a village in Qushkhaneh-ye Bala Rural District, Qushkhaneh District, Shirvan County, North Khorasan Province, Iran. At the time of the 2006 census, its population was 507, in 104 families.

References 

Populated places in Shirvan County